This list of governors of Puerto Rico includes all persons who have held that post, either under Spanish or American rule. The governor of Puerto Rico is the head of government of the Commonwealth of Puerto Rico. The position was first established by the Spanish Empire during the 16th century following the archipelago's colonization.

The first person to officially occupy the position was Spanish conquistador Juan Ponce de León in 1509.
At the time, the Spanish monarchy was responsible for appointing the functionary who would perform this office. The first native Puerto Rican to perform the function was Juan Ponce de León II, as interim governor in 1579. During this administration, all of those appointed to take the position had served another function within the empire's government or the Roman Catholic Church. In 1898, the United States invaded Puerto Rico and the Spanish government ceded control of the island to the United States. During the first two years, the entire government in Puerto Rico was appointed by the president of the United States. In 1900, the American government approved the establishment of the Foraker Act as a federal law, this act established a civilian government in the island. In 1947, the federal Elective Governor Act was enacted, which created a new system where, since 1948, the governor is elected through a democratic process every four years. The governor is in charge of Puerto Rico's executive branch and is responsible for appointing executive branch agency heads, including the Secretary of State, who fulfills the role of lieutenant governor, the legislative branch's ombudsman and comptroller and all judges in the judicial branch.

Duties and succession

In the governor's absence, or if the governor dies or is unable to perform the executive duties, the Secretary of State of Puerto Rico takes control of the executive position, as acting governor during a temporary absence or inability, and as governor in case of death, resignation or impeachment and conviction. The elected governor must designate a number of secretaries and other agency heads that will control the individual administrative agencies during his time in office, the selected secretaries are in charge of the island's health, natural resources, economy, correctional and judicial agencies and the department of consumer concerns, among others. The Governor's four-year term begins on January 2, the day after the New Year's Day holiday.

On July 24, 2019, Ricardo Rosselló became the first governor to resign his office. This happened after more than a week of protests due to a chain of corruption arrests and a leaked Telegram chat which contained offensive remarks made by the governor.

List of governors of Puerto Rico

 Governors under Spanish Crown 

 Governors under U.S. colonial administration 
Military government

Post-Foraker Act of 1900

 Governors under the Constitution of the Commonwealth of Puerto Rico 
 (7)
 (7)US party affiliation'''

 (10)
 (3)
 (1)

See also

 First ladies and gentlemen of Puerto Rico
 Resident Commissioner of Puerto Rico
 History of Puerto Rico
 Politics of Puerto Rico

Notes

References

External links
 List of Puerto Rico Governors — on WorldStatesmen.org

 01
Colonial Puerto Rico
Puerto Rico
Puerto Rico
Governors of Puerto Rico
History of Puerto Rico
1509 establishments in the Spanish West Indies
1898 disestablishments in the Spanish West Indies

pl:Gubernatorzy Portoryko